Texas's 3rd congressional district of the United States House of Representatives is in the suburban areas north and northeast of Dallas. It encompasses much of Collin County, including McKinney and Allen, as well as parts of Plano, Frisco, and Prosper. Additionally, the district includes all but the southern portion of Hunt County. The district is also home to a public four-year university, Texas A&M University-Commerce, as well as Collin College.

Texas has had at least three congressional districts since 1869. The current seat dates from a mid-decade redistricting conducted before the 1966 elections after Texas's original 1960s map was thrown out by Wesberry v. Sanders.  In past configurations, it has been one of the most Republican districts in both Texas and the Dallas–Fort Worth metroplex. The GOP has held the seat since a 1968 special election. The district's current congressman is Keith Self.

As of the 2010 census, the 3rd district represents 765,486 people who are predominantly middle-to-upper-class (median family income is US$80,912). The district is 59.1 percent White (non-Hispanic), 15.06 percent Hispanic or Latino (of any race), 13 percent Asian, and 8.9 percent Black or African American.

2012 redistricting
From 1967 to 2013, the district included large portions of Dallas County. Eventually, the 3rd covered much of northern Dallas County, including Garland, Rowlett and much of northern Dallas itself. It was pushed into Collin County in 1983. Since then, Collin County's rapid growth resulted in the district's share of Dallas County being gradually reduced.

After redistricting in 2012, the Dallas County portion of the district was removed altogether.  However, it still includes the Dallas precincts located in Collin County.

2021 redistricting 
From 2013 to 2021, the district represented suburban areas north and northeast of Dallas. It encompassed much of Collin County, including McKinney, Plano, and the majority of Frisco, as well as a portion of the city of Dallas. The district was also home to the public college Collin College, and the Frisco campus of the University of North Texas.

After redistricting in 2021, the Dallas and Richardson portions of the district were removed, as well as much of Plano and Frisco. The Richardson portion of the district was transferred to District 32, while the Plano, Dallas, and Frisco portions were given to District 4. In return, District 3 was expanded eastward to encompass most of Hunt County.

Voting

List of members representing the district

Recent election results

2004

2006

2008

2010

2012

2014

2016

Adam P. Bell was the first Democrat to run for Texas's 3rd since the redistricting effort of 2012.

2018

The incumbent representative, Sam Johnson, decided not to run for reelection in 2018, after having represented Texas's 3rd since 1991. His stated reason for retiring was that "the Lord has made clear that the season of my life in Congress is coming to an end".

2020

2022

See also
List of United States congressional districts

References

 Congressional Biographical Directory of the United States 1774–present
 Texas Secretary of State 2010 General Election Statewide Race Summary

03
Dallas County, Texas
Collin County, Texas